Lieutenant-Colonel William Fitch  (died 1795) was a British Army officer, who was killed fighting the Jamaican Maroons during the Second Maroon War.

Military career
Fitch was commissioned into the 65th Regiment of Foot on 28 November 1775. He was promoted, in the same regiment, to lieutenant on 2 January 1779 and to captain on 7 December 1779. 

Fitch was then promoted to major in the 51st Regiment of Foot on 30 November 1791 and then transferred to the 55th Regiment of Foot on 25 April 1792 before being appointed Lieutenant-Colonel Commandant of the 83rd Regiment of Foot on 28 September 1793.

Death
Fitch embarked for the West Indies in May 1795 and was deployed to Jamaica where he was killed in action later that year during the Second Maroon War.

Newly arrived in Jamaica, Fitch ignored the advice of his experienced Maroon trackers, and led his forces into an ambush by the Maroons of Cudjoe's Town, which resulted in the deaths of Fitch, many members of the white militia, and a number of Accompong warriors.

References

Sources

 

1795 deaths
65th Regiment of Foot officers
British military personnel killed in action
55th Regiment of Foot officers
King's Own Yorkshire Light Infantry officers
83rd (County of Dublin) Regiment of Foot officers